Cowan Lake, also known as Cowan Creek Reservoir, is a lake within Cowan Lake State Park in Clinton County, Ohio, United States. Cowan Lake lies near the Cincinnati Arch, an uplifting of bedrock that occurred during the Appalachian Mountains' building process. The erosion of this arch in the Cowan region exposes fossil-rich limestone. The limestone near Cowan and other parts of the exposed arch are some of the most famous fossil hunting fields in the world.

The lake takes its name from Cowan Creek, the creek that was dammed in 1950 to form the lake. Cowan Creek was named for John Cowan, the first surveyor of the area.

Cowan Lake State Park, which includes the lakes and its immediate surroundings, was dedicated in 1968.

References

External links
Cowan Lake Sailing Association
Cowan Lake Fishing
 

Reservoirs in Ohio
Bodies of water of Clinton County, Ohio